Kevin Preston Maxwell (born March 30, 1960) is a Canadian former professional ice hockey forward who played 49 games in the National Hockey League for the Colorado Rockies, Minnesota North Stars, and New Jersey Devils. Later Maxwell scouted for the Dallas Stars, New York Islanders and Philadelphia Flyers.

Early life 
Maxwell was born in Edmonton. He played junior hockey with the Penticton Vees and in college with the North Dakota Fighting Hawks men's ice hockey team.

Career 
Maxwell represented Canada at the 1980 Winter Olympics held in Lake Placid. In six games he scored 5 assists with 4 penalty minutes.

His NHL career spanned three seasons and 66 games, scoring six goals and 15 assists, with 61 penalty minutes. During the 1981 Stanley Cup playoffs and the North Stars finals run, he played 16 games and contributed three goals, four assists, and dogged defensive play.

As of 2022, he is the general manager of the Springfield Thunderbirds of the AHL.

Career statistics

Regular season and playoffs

International

Awards and honors

References

External links
Kevin Maxwell on eliteprospects.com

1960 births
Living people
AHCA Division I men's ice hockey All-Americans
Canadian ice hockey forwards
Colorado Rockies (NHL) players
Dallas Stars scouts
Hartford Whalers
Hartford Whalers scouts
Ice hockey players at the 1980 Winter Olympics
Minnesota North Stars draft picks
Minnesota North Stars players
New Jersey Devils players
New York Islanders scouts
New York Rangers scouts
North Dakota Fighting Hawks men's ice hockey players
Olympic ice hockey players of Canada
Penticton Vees players
Philadelphia Flyers scouts
Ice hockey people from Edmonton
Wichita Wind players